Surrey Central is an elevated station on the Expo Line of Metro Vancouver's SkyTrain rapid transit system. The station is located in the Whalley / City Centre district of Surrey, British Columbia, Canada, just east of the North Surrey Recreation Centre. The station is within walking distance of the Central City shopping centre, Surrey City Hall, and SFU Surrey, the Surrey campus of Simon Fraser University.

History
Surrey Central station was opened in 1994 along with two other stations when the Expo Line was extended from Scott Road station farther into Whalley, to the "Surrey City Centre" district. Prior to the opening of the station, there was a bus loop on the site known as "Whalley Exchange", which opened in 1975. The station was briefly known as "Whalley Central" during planning; however, the name "Surrey Central" was chosen after an ad was placed in the local paper calling on residents to propose an appropriate name.

Over the years, the station has earned a reputation for being unsafe and a magnet for crime, including violence and drug trafficking. In 2009, it had the second-highest number of violent crimes in the SkyTrain system (with Commercial–Broadway station having the highest).

In an effort to combat the station's rundown image, and to show off experimental urban design, the City of Surrey and TransLink agreed to have Surrey Central station participate in the GVTA's Urban Transit Village program. The Transit Villages were defined by TransLink as "a new approach to station design and access." While the original schedule called for construction to be completed by the second quarter of 2007, nothing beyond design plans were completed. The Surrey Central plan specifically called for improvements in four areas: station access, street design, King George Boulevard, and land use.

Officers from the Metro Vancouver Transit Police can be found patrolling the bus loop and SkyTrain platform in an effort to reduce crime and disorder, with supplemental volunteers patrolling the area and reporting any suspicious or dangerous behaviour. By the mid-2010s, with extensive police patrols and redevelopment of the area, violent crimes shifted from Whalley south to Newton, which has taken over the area's reputation of being the most dangerous part of Surrey.

In March 2017, station upgrades started on Surrey Central station to create two new entrances on the north side of the station at Central Avenue and City Parkway to reduce congestion. Accessibility and lighting was also improved with three additional escalators and an elevator. Construction work was completed in February 2019, and the new stationhouse opened to the public in March 2019.

Services
Surrey Central station is a transfer point for several bus routes that serve various areas of Surrey, White Rock, North Delta and Langley.

Station information

Station layout

Entrances

 North stationhouse : located at the corner of Central Avenue and City Parkway, the stationhouse provides access to Surrey City Centre Public Library, Surrey City Hall and the Kwantlen Polytechnic University Civic Plaza campus. Renovations on the north entrances started in March 2017 to improve circulation and accessibility and the new stationhouse opened in March 2019.
 Rec Centre entrance (east) : located on City Parkway and provides access to downtown Surrey and the North Surrey Recreation Centre. R1 King George Blvd stops are also located in front of this entrance.
 Bus Exchange entrance (southwest): located within the Surrey Central station bus exchange. An up escalator and stairs connect the bus exchange with the station platform via the concourse. This entrance also serves the Central City shopping centre and SFU Surrey Campus.

Transit connections

Bus bay assignments are as follows:

References

External links
 

Expo Line (SkyTrain) stations
Railway stations in Canada opened in 1994
Buildings and structures in Surrey, British Columbia
Transport in Surrey, British Columbia
1994 establishments in British Columbia